Tamana Girls High School (玉名女子高校学校 Tamana joshi kōkōgakkō) is a girls high school in Tamana, Kumamoto, Japan. It was founded in April 1925 under the name 'tamana jussen jogakuin' (lit. Tamana Practice Girls' College). In 1963 assumed its present name.

Renaming History
1925 'tamana jussen jogakuin' (Tamana Practice Girls' College)
1927 'tamana jussen jogakkō' (Tamana Practice Girls' School)
1929 'tamana joshi shokugyō gakkō' (Tamana All-Girls Business School)
1942 'kumamoto-ken tamana kōtō kasei jogakuin' (Tamana Girls' Household School of Kumamoto)
1948 'tamana kasei kōtōgakkō' (Tamana Household School)
1963 'tamana joshi kōtō gakkō'(Tamana Girls' High School)

Subjects
Some subjects taught at Tamana High School are:
Business
Culinary
Nursing

Sister Schools
Clarinda High School (Clarinda, IA)
Graham-Kapowsin High School (Spanaway, WA)

References

External links
Tamana Official site (in Japanese)

Schools in Kumamoto Prefecture
Educational institutions established in 1925
1925 establishments in Japan